German submarine U-869 was a Type IXC/40 U-boat of the German Navy (Kriegsmarine) during World War II, her keel was laid down 5 April 1943 by Deutsche Schiff- und Maschinenbau AG Weser of Bremen. It was commissioned on 26 January 1944 with Kapitänleutnant Hellmut Neuerburg in command. Neuerburg went down with his boat. The wreck of U-869 was discovered off the coast of New Jersey in 1991.

Design
German Type IXC/40 submarines were slightly larger than the original Type IXCs. U-869 had a displacement of  when at the surface and  while submerged. She had two shafts and two  propellers.

U-869 was fitted with six  torpedo tubes (four fitted at the bow and two at the stern), 22 torpedoes, one  SK C/32 naval gun, 180 rounds, and a  Flak M42 as well as two twin  C/30 anti-aircraft guns. The boat had a complement of 48.

Service history
U-869 conducted one World War II war patrol without success. It suffered no casualties to her crew until it was lost on 11 February 1945, with all but one of 56 crew members dead. The surviving crew member, Herbert Guschewski, was not on board, as he became ill just before the patrol. Robert Kurson chronicled the story of U-869s finding in the book Shadow Divers (2004).

Engagement near Morocco

On 28 February 1945, the American destroyer escort  and the French submarine chaser L'Indiscret conducted a depth charge attack on a submerged contact in the Atlantic, near Rabat, and reported a kill, although little visible evidence was presented to confirm the kill. Based on the information provided, U.S. Naval Intelligence rated the attacks "G—No Damage". U-869 had been previously ordered by Karl Dönitz to move her area of operations from the North American coast to the Gibraltar area. Postwar investigators upgraded the rating from "G—No Damage" to "B—Probably Sunk", leading to an erroneous historical record that U-869 was sunk near Gibraltar. For many years this attack was assumed to have been her end.

Discovery off U.S. coast
In 1991, Bill Nagle, a former wreck diver and the captain of Seeker, learned about a wreck off New Jersey and decided to mount a diving expedition to the site. On 2 September 1991, an unidentified U-boat wreck was discovered 73 meters (240 feet) deep (a hazardous depth for standard scuba diving) off the coast of New Jersey. The discoverers of U-Who, John Chatterton, Richie Kohler, and Kevin Brennan, continued to dive the wreck for the next several years. (Three divers, Steve Feldman, Chris Rouse and "Chrissy" Rouse, died exploring U-869.) Eventually, the team recovered a knife inscribed with "Horenburg", a crew member's name. However, they learned at the U-boat archives that U-869 was supposedly sent to Africa, so this piece of evidence was initially disregarded. A few years later, they found part of the UZO torpedo aiming device, and a spare parts box from the motor room engraved with serial and other identifying numbers. On 31 August 1997 they concluded that the boat they found was U-869.

Cause of sinking
The men who found U-869 believed it was a victim of her own torpedo, which may have become a "circle-runner". Torpedoes manufactured later in the war had acoustical seeking capability. It was theorized that the torpedo was initially fired in a turning pattern and when it missed her target, it picked up the sound of the submarine's propeller. Chatterton and Kohler based their theory largely on a lack of evidence to support other causes for sinking. They claimed there was no reported naval activity in the vicinity, thereby ruling out a sinking by attack. Moreover, the damage to the hull was from the outside and thereby ruled out an internal explosion.

Gary Gentile, a noted wreck diver, researcher, and author, rejects Chatteron and Kohler's theory.

The United States Coast Guard, in its official evaluation of the evidence, discarded the circle-running torpedo theory and awarded the sinking to the two destroyers. This was confirmed by Marlyn Berkey, who was on a destroyer as part of the Pacific fleet entering New York Harbor after the war's end; the submarine showed up on sonar, Berkey's destroyer depth charged the sub, it sank as evidenced by oil and debris that floated on the surface; the destroyer's crew was allowed to place a broom upside down atop the mainmast coming into New York, which meant "clean sweep". Contributing to their findings are two damage holes in the wreck of U-869, which are more consistent with the attack reports that cited two explosions than with the circle runner theory which would only explain one hole. The official records state that U-869 was destroyed on 11 February 1945 by two U.S. destroyer escorts, Howard D. Crow and Koiner. John Chatterton, one of the divers who discovered U-869 in 1991, states in Wreck Diving Magazine his belief that the two U.S. destroyer escorts attacked the wreck of U-869 after the U-boat had been struck by her own torpedo.

Lone survivor

Only one crew member survived by virtue of not having been aboard. Second Radio Officer Herbert Guschewski came down with pneumonia and pleurisy shortly before the boat's departure. Like the families of the crew, Guschewski did not know what happened to his fellow sailors until 1999. He watched a program which eventually became the PBS NOVA episode "Hitler's Lost Sub" and contacted the producers shortly afterward, who interviewed him and placed a portion of it in the 2000 American broadcast.

References

Bibliography

External links
 Hitler's Lost Sub Educational website companion to PBS NOVA documentary originally broadcast 14 November 2000. Includes "virtual tour" of submarine and account of survivor. Accessed 15 November 2006.
 Divers Tell Tale Of Mystery Sub: U-Who? 6-Year Search Nets Answers 2 September 2005. Lengthy CBS News story including photographs of surviving divers. Accessed 15 November 2006.
 Hitler's Lost Sub Transcript of the 14 November 2000 documentary. Accessed 15 November 2006.
 Dive photos of U-869 wreck from 2000.

German Type IX submarines
U-boats commissioned in 1944
U-boats sunk in 1945
World War II submarines of Germany
Shipwrecks of the New Jersey coast
U-boats sunk by depth charges
U-boats sunk by US warships
World War II shipwrecks in the Atlantic Ocean
1943 ships
Ships built in Bremen (state)
Ships lost with all hands
Maritime incidents in February 1945